The Camden Shipyard & Maritime Museum is a maritime museum in the Waterfront South neighborhood of Camden, New Jersey, across the Delaware River from Philadelphia.

The museum opened in September 2016. Its main building is the former Church of our Savior, and its grounds include land once owned by the New York Shipbuilding Co., which is said to have been, at one time, the largest shipbuilder in the world. The museum partners with UrbanPromise on their Urban BoatWorks program, which teaches middle-school and high-school students wooden boat-building.

References

External links
 

Tourist attractions in Camden, New Jersey
Maritime museums in New Jersey
Museums in Camden County, New Jersey
Museums established in 2016
2016 establishments in New Jersey
New York Shipbuilding Corporation